Charles Robert Simmer (born March 20, 1954) is a Canadian former professional ice hockey forward, most notably for the Los Angeles Kings in the National Hockey League, who was known for his scoring  prowess.

Playing career
After a junior career with the Sault Ste. Marie Greyhounds of the Ontario Hockey Association that saw him score 99 points in his only season (1973–74), Simmer was selected in the third round of the 1974 NHL amateur draft, 39th overall, by the California Golden Seals, where he joined a young field of players such as Larry Patey, Rick Hampton, George Pesut, Al McAdam and Stan Weir. He split his first three professional seasons between the Seals and the Salt Lake Golden Eagles of the CHL, having success in the minors but receiving limited playing time in the NHL. The Seals relocated to Cleveland in 1976, but Simmer did not receive more playing time.

He was traded in 1977 to the Los Angeles Kings, but spent the season with the Springfield Indians of the AHL, winning All-Star accolades. The next season Simmer was promoted halfway through the campaign to the Kings, and scored 21 goals in 39 games.

While with the Kings, he played left wing on the "Triple Crown Line" with Marcel Dionne and Dave Taylor, one of the most potent and famed forward lines of the era.  Despite injuries costing him significant playing time, Simmer had back-to-back 56-goal seasons and was further named an NHL first team All-Star in 1980 and 1981. In the latter season, Simmer almost accomplished one of hockey's most difficult feats: scoring 50 goals in 50 games. Simmer entered his 50th game with 46 goals and scored three times to finish just shy of the mark; that same night, Mike Bossy became only the second player in NHL history to score 50 in 50. Simmer scored his 50th goal the following night in his 51st game. Simmer's shooting percentage of 32.75 in 1981 was, and remains, an NHL record.

Simmer was traded at the beginning of the 1985 season to the Boston Bruins, where despite the cumulative effects of several injuries throughout his career, he starred for three more seasons. In 1986, Simmer won the Bill Masterton Trophy for his perseverance and dedication to hockey.

Simmer played his final NHL season, for the Pittsburgh Penguins, in 1988. He subsequently played the 1989 season for Eintracht Frankfurt in the German Bundesliga and, after a season off, parts of two seasons as a player-coach for the minor league San Diego Gulls before retiring.

Retirement
Simmer finished his NHL career with 711 points (342 goals, 369 assists) in 712 career games.  At the time of his retirement, he was the last active player in North American professional hockey to have played for the Seals-Barons franchise (though Dennis Maruk was the last alum of the franchise to play in the NHL, upon his retirement in 1989.)

He was formerly married to one-time Playboy Playmate of the Year Terri Welles; the couple had one daughter. Simmer spent years as a color commentator for the Phoenix Coyotes and the Calgary Flames on Sportsnet.

Career statistics

Regular season and playoffs

International

Awards and achievements 
 MJHL first All-Star team (1973)
 MJHL Scoring Champion (1973)
 NHL All-Star Game in 1981 and 1984.
 NHL first All-Star team in 1980 and 1981.
 Bill Masterton Trophy in 1986.
 Central Hockey League second All-Star team in 1977.
 American Hockey League second All-Star team in 1978.
 Scored goals in thirteen consecutive games in 1980, the longest such streak since Punch Broadbent's still unbroken record of sixteen in 1922.

References

External links
 

1954 births
Anaheim Ducks announcers
Bill Masterton Memorial Trophy winners
Boston Bruins players
Calgary Flames announcers
California Golden Seals draft picks
California Golden Seals players
Canadian ice hockey left wingers
Cleveland Barons (NHL) players
Cleveland Crusaders draft picks
Ice hockey people from Ontario
Living people
Los Angeles Kings players
Kenora Muskies players
National Hockey League All-Stars
People from Thunder Bay District
Pittsburgh Penguins players
Sault Ste. Marie Greyhounds players
Springfield Indians players